WBBS (104.7 FM "B-104.7 FM") is a country music-formatted radio station serving the Syracuse area. The studios and offices are located at on Plum Street in Syracuse. It is the Syracuse  affiliate station. The iHeartMedia outlet broadcasts with an ERP of 50 kW from a transmitter site located near East Mud Lake Rd and Lamson Rd northwest of the city of Syracuse and is licensed to Fulton, New York.

History
The station, which debuted in 1961 as WOSC, with the call sign representing its home county, Oswego County. The station has been a country music outlet since 1993 and adopted the WBBS-FM calls shortly after changing the format. Past formats included Top 40/CHR (as WKFM in the 1970s until 1985 as "104.7 HitRadio KFM"), AOR (as simply "WKFM" from 1985 until the late 1980s), and classic rock (as "104.7 KIX-FM").

B104.7 formerly held an annual summer concert with national recording acts called B-Jam, which has most recently coordinated with Harborfest in Oswego, NY, which last was held in 2007

Up until 2007, WBBS competed with Sandy Creek-based WSCP and WSCP-FM. In August 2009, WBBS was challenged by WVOA-FM, which became a country music station WOLF-FM, known as "The Wolf." Incidentally, WOLF-FM was WBBS' former sister station and simulcast partner under the call sign WXBB.

Personalities
Current WBBS on-air personalities include The Bobby Bones Show in mornings, mid-day program The Boxer Show, afternoon drive host Rich Lauber, evening host Michael Jay, and syndicated radio program CMT After Midnite with Granger Smith during overnights.  Weekend hosts include Daryl Thomas, Angie Ward, and Chris Randolph.

Former morning team hosts Tom Owens and Becky Palmer were nominated for a CMA and ACM awards in 2009 and 2010.

In 2004, B104.7's Ron and Becky received a CMA Award for "Personality of the Year" for a US Medium Market.

Weather is provided by Dave Longley and news by Christie Casciano from WSYR-TV.

External links
B-104.7's website
CNYMedia's Syracuse FM history

BBS
Radio stations established in 1961
1961 establishments in New York (state)
IHeartMedia radio stations